Mount Dana is a mountain on the boundary between Yosemite National Park and Ansel Adams Wilderness in California.

Mount Dana may also refer to:

 Mount Dana (Alaska)
 Mount Dana (Washington)

See also
 Dana Mountains, Antarctica